George and the Dragon may refer to:

George and the Dragon (Efteling), a wooden roller coaster
George and the Dragon (TV series), a British television sitcom broadcast between 1966 and 1968
Saint George and the Dragon, a medieval legend
George and the Dragon (2004 film), a film released in 2004 starring James Purefoy

See also

George and Dragon (disambiguation)
Saint George and the Dragon (disambiguation)
The Dragon and the George